Hongyan may refer to:

Red Crag, 1961 Chinese novel by Luo Guangbin and Yang Yiyan
Dam Street, 2005 Chinese film by Li Yu
 Red Rock Village Museum, or Hongyan Village
 Hongyan River (红岩河), a tributary of Liuchong River
Hongyan, an automotive marque owned by SAIC Iveco Hongyan

Towns in China (红岩镇)
 Hongyan, Suining, Hunan
 Hongyan, Guangyuan, Sichuan
 Hongyan, Pengzhou, Sichuan
 Hongyan, Midu, Yunnan

Townships in China (红岩乡)
 Hongyan, Liupanshui, Guizhou
 Hongyan, Hongjiang, Hunan
 Hongyan, Heishui, Sichuan
 Hongyan, Huaying, Sichuan
 Hongyan, Huidong, Sichuan
 Hongyan, Linshui, Sichuan
 Hongyan, Mingshan, Sichuan
 Hongyan, Nanjiang, Sichuan

Given names
 Pi Hongyan, badminton player
 Xi Hongyan, ice dancer
 Xiao Hongyan, runner
 Yan Hongyan, general
 Zhong Hongyan, canoeist
 Aisin Gioro Hongyan, manchu prince

See also
 Hongyanhe Nuclear Power Plant